The Masonic Temple is a historic building in Downtown Columbus, Ohio. It was constructed as a meeting hall for local area Masonic lodges in 1899, and was listed on the National Register of Historic Places in 1997.

The building was first designed in 1898 by Yost & Packard, Kremer & Hart and John M. Freese. It was substantially expanded in 1912-13 under the design of Stribling & Lum, and was renovated further in 1935. By the 1913 renovation, it was considered the largest building used solely for the Masonic order. At a later date it housed a commercial catering venue for weddings and other events.

See also
York Rite Masonic Temple, also in Columbus and also NRHP-listed

References

External links
 

Clubhouses on the National Register of Historic Places in Ohio
National Register of Historic Places in Columbus, Ohio
Neoclassical architecture in Ohio
Masonic buildings completed in 1899
Former Masonic buildings in Ohio
Buildings in downtown Columbus, Ohio
Yost and Packard buildings